L'École secondaire catholique La Citadelle is a French-Language Catholic high school located in Cornwall, Ontario. It is managed by the Conseil scolaire de district catholique de l'Est ontarien.

References

External links
 École secondaire catholique La Citadelle

Catholic secondary schools in Ontario
French-language high schools in Ontario
High schools in Cornwall, Ontario